Hinduism is a minor religion in Iran. As of 2015, there were 39,200 Hindus residing in Iran.

Two Hindu temples were built by the Arya Samaj, one in Bandar Abbas and one in Zahedan, both funded by Indian merchants in the late 19th century.

A.C. Bhaktivedanta Swami Prabhupada traveled to Tehran in 1976. Since 1977, ISKCON runs a vegetarian restaurant in Tehran.

Demographics

In 2010, there were about 20,000 Hindus in Iran which increased to 39,200 in 2015.

List of Hindu temples 

Following are some of the notable Hindu pilgrimages in Iran
 Bandar Abbas Vishnu Temple

See also
 Zoroastrianism in India
 Religious freedom in Iran
 Religion in Iran
 Buddhism in Iran
 Sikhism in Iran

References

External links
Refugee status given to Iranian Gaudiya Vaishnava immigrant

 
Religion in Iran
Iran